The 1986 Cork Senior Hurling Championship was the 98th staging of the Cork Senior Hurling Championship since its establishment by the Cork County Board in 1887. The championship began on 2 May 1986 and ended on 5 October 1986.

Blackrock entered the championship as the defending champions.

The final was played on 5 October 1986 at Páirc Uí Chaoimh in Cork, between Midleton and Blackrock, in what was their second successive meeting in the final. Midleton won the match by 1-18 to 1-10 to claim their fourth championship title overall and a first title in three years.

Midleton's Ger Fitzgerald was the championship's top scorer with 5-17.

Team changes

From Championship

Regraded to the Cork Intermediate Hurling Championship
 Erin's Own

Declined to field a team
 University College Cork

Results

First round

Quarter-finals

Semi-finals

Final

Championship statistics

Top scorers

Top scorers overall

Top scorers in a single game

References

Cork Senior Hurling Championship
Cork Senior Hurling Championship